The Progressive Liberation Front (commonly known by its acronym 'جات', Gat) was a small communist organization in Egypt. The organization emerged in 1948 as a split from the Democratic Movement for National Liberation (HADITU). Leaders of Gat included Issamuddin Jilal, Ahmed Taha, Ismail Jibr, Salah Salma and Ehia al-Mazsi.

Gat merged with HADITU-Revolutionary Action, but Gat was reconstituted when HADITU-Revolutionary Action ceased to function. In 1950, Gat rejoined HADITU, but remained a separately fraction in the Egyptian communist movement during various years of the 1950s. Ahmed Taha was the sole Gat member on the Central Committee of HADITU.

References

Defunct communist parties in Egypt
Political parties established in 1948